Earning to give involves deliberately pursuing a high-earning career for the purpose of donating a significant portion of earned income, typically because of a desire to do effective altruism. Advocates of earning to give contend that maximizing the amount one can donate to charity is an important consideration for individuals when deciding what career to pursue.

Proponents
In the 1996 book Living High and Letting Die, the philosopher Peter Unger wrote that it was morally praiseworthy and perhaps even morally required for people in academia who could earn substantially greater salaries in the business world to leave academia, earn the greater salaries, and donate most of the extra money to charity. Moral philosopher Peter Singer laid the foundations for effective altruism and earning to give in his 1971 essay "Famine, Affluence and Morality" and since advocated for donating considerable amounts of one's income to effective charitable organizations. Singer is a public proponent of effective altruism and endorsed earning to give in his 2013 TED talk. Associate Professor in Philosophy at Oxford University William MacAskill promoted earning to give as one possible high impact career in several news articles and in his 2015 book Doing Good Better: Effective Altruism and a Radical New Way to Make a Difference. MacAskill is the co-founder and president of 80,000 Hours, a nonprofit which conducts research on careers with positive social impact and provides career advice. Initially, the organization recommended earning to give as a career path with a high impact potential for effective altruists, though more recently it has deemphasised this approach, in favour of alternative paths like research, advocacy or policy reform.

In practice
Many of the people who practice earning to give consider themselves to be part of the effective altruism community. Some donate more than 50% of their income, more than the 10% required for the basic Giving What We Can pledge. They may live frugally to donate more money. Jobs in finance, particularly in quantitative trading, are popular for those pursuing earning to give.
Earning to give is sometimes more effective than working at a NGO, because if the NGO becomes ineffective, then one can switch to donating to a different charity on a moment's notice.

Debate
David Brooks criticized the concept in his column in The New York Times, arguing that, while altruists may start doing "earning to give" to realize their deepest commitments, their values may erode over time, becoming progressively less altruistic. Similarly, John Humphrys criticised this idea on the BBC Today programme, saying that people interested in becoming wealthy tend to be selfish and that idealistic young people will become cynical as they age. In addition, Brooks objected to the view on which altruists should turn themselves "into a machine for the redistribution of wealth." Peter Singer responded to these criticisms in his book The Most Good You Can Do by giving examples of people who have been earning to give for years without losing their altruistic motivation. William MacAskill also defended the practice against Brooks' criticisms in The Washington Post, arguing that even Friedrich Engels was earning to give to support the work of anti-capitalist Karl Marx financially. Dana Goldstein has also criticized earning to give, prompting a response from Reihan Salam.

Another concern was raised in the Oxford Left Review by Pete Mills, who wrote that lucrative careers perpetuate an unjust system.

Sam Bankman-Fried, at one point the wealthiest person in the world under 30, founded the cryptocurrency exchange FTX with the explicit goal of donating the vast majority of profits to cost-effective causes. Bankman-Fried started philanthropic foundations with some of his earnings, but upon a crisis leading to FTX's bankruptcy, staff from the FTX Future Fund publicly resigned, saying that they had "fundamental questions about the legitimacy and integrity" of Bankman-Fried's businesses. The crisis at FTX led to speculation about whether donations linked to the firm might be clawed back from organizations that Bankman-Fried's foundations funded. In some cases, donations have been clawed back from charitable organizations, including $200,000 that had to be returned in 2011 by charities funded by convicted fraudster Tom Petters.

Earning to give through jobs that may cause harm

Earning to give has been a subject of debate: High profile individuals and institutions within the movement have disagreed on when it is appropriate to work in morally controversial jobs. William MacAskill argued in 2014 that sufficient donations might justify an otherwise morally controversial career, since the impact of taking an unethical job is small if someone else would have taken it regardless, while the impact of the donations could be large. Singer has also said that even those who take a job complicit in causing harm can, for example, lobby the organization to change its harmful practices, which may be easier to do from their position inside the organization, or quit and blow the whistle on the organization, which might not be possible without gaining information while on the job. In 2017, 80,000 Hours recommended that it is better to avoid careers that do significant direct harm, even if it seems like the negative consequences could be outweighed by donations. This is because the harms from such careers may be hidden or otherwise hard to measure.

References

External links
Jeff Kaufman, 'History of earning to give', parts 1, 2, 3

Altruism
Charity
Donation
Giving
Philanthropy
Business ethics
Career development